Samir Arab (born 25 March 1994) is a Maltese footballer who plays as a defender for Balzan and the Malta national team.

Career
Arab made his international debut for Malta on 7 October 2020 in a friendly match against Gibraltar.

Career statistics

International

References

External links
 
 

1994 births
Living people
Maltese footballers
Malta youth international footballers
Malta under-21 international footballers
Malta international footballers
Association football defenders
Valletta F.C. players
Vittoriosa Stars F.C. players
Balzan F.C. players
Maltese Premier League players